Scottish Socialist Party is an organization formed in 1998 from the Scottish Socialist Alliance.

Scottish Socialist Party may also refer to:

Scottish Socialist Party (1942), led by William Oliver Brown
Scottish Socialist Party (1932), split from the Independent Labour Party, led by Patrick Dollan
Scottish Labour Party (1888), formed by Robert Bontine Cunninghame Graham

See also
Socialist Party Scotland, Scottish section of the Committee for a Workers' International